The Circle of Reason is the first novel by  Indian writer Amitav Ghosh. It was published in 1986.
His first novel, The Circle of Reason (1986), follows an Indian protagonist who, suspected of being a terrorist, leaves India for northern Africa and the Middle East. Blending elements of fable and picaresque fiction, it is distinctly postcolonial in its marginalization of Europe and postmodern in its nonlinear structure and thick intertextuality.

Awards
The Circle of Reason won the Prix Medicis Étrangère, a French literary award, in 1990.

References

Indian literature in English
1986 Indian novels
1986 novels
Novels by Amitav Ghosh
1986 debut novels
Hamish Hamilton books